Jarryd Hughes (born 21 May 1995) is an Australian snowboarder. He achieved second in boardercross at the 2018 PyeongChang Winter Olympics.

Career
He competed at the 2012 FIS Snowboard World Cup as a 16-year-old and came in at 10th place at the Stoneham World Cup in Quebec, Canada. Since his debut he has gone on to win a Gold and a Silver Medal at the FIS Junior World Championships, win the Lake Louise World Cup in 2013 and represent Australia at the Sochi 2014 Winter Olympics.

While still one of the youngest athletes on the World Cup Tour, Jarryd has been a consistent performer in the top-10 on the World Cup Circuit and been the youngest ever World number-one. In January 2016, Jarryd won Gold in the Snowboardcross event at X Games in Aspen Colorado making him the youngest ever winner and the first Australian male to win a Gold Medal at Winter X. He won the Silver Medal at the 2018 Winter Olympics.

References

External links

1995 births
Australian male snowboarders
Snowboarders at the 2014 Winter Olympics
Snowboarders at the 2018 Winter Olympics
Snowboarders at the 2022 Winter Olympics
Olympic snowboarders of Australia
X Games athletes
Living people
Olympic silver medalists for Australia
Olympic medalists in snowboarding
Medalists at the 2018 Winter Olympics
Sportspeople from Sydney